Rembert van Delden (April 3, 1917 – February 5, 1999) was a German politician of the Christian Democratic Union (CDU) and former member of the German Bundestag.

Life 
From 1956 van Delden was a member of the CDU. Van Delden had been a council member of the Ammeln municipality since 1959. He was a member of the German Bundestag from 1961 to 1976. He had always entered parliament via the state list of the CDU North Rhine-Westphalia.

Literature

References

1917 births
1999 deaths
Members of the Bundestag for North Rhine-Westphalia
Members of the Bundestag 1972–1976
Members of the Bundestag 1969–1972
Members of the Bundestag 1965–1969
Members of the Bundestag 1961–1965
Members of the Bundestag for the Christian Democratic Union of Germany